The Girl from Bejar is a 1926 Spanish silent drama film directed by Eusebio Fernández Ardavín.

Cast
 María Luz Callejo
 Luis Comendador]
 Celia Escudero  
 Luis González 'Don Lince' 
 Luis González 
 Antonio Mata
 Dolores Moreno
 José Nieto 
 Modesto Rivas
 Ángel del Río
 Taquinino

References

Bibliography
  Eva Woods Peiró. White Gypsies: Race and Stardom in Spanish Musical Films. U of Minnesota Press, 2012.

External links

1926 films
Spanish silent films
Films directed by Eusebio Fernández Ardavín
Spanish black-and-white films
1926 drama films
Spanish drama films
Silent drama films